Newberne is an unincorporated community in Gilmer County, West Virginia, United States. Newberne had a post office, which closed on May 13, 1995.

References

Unincorporated communities in Gilmer County, West Virginia
Unincorporated communities in West Virginia